Ballade No. 1 in D-flat major, S.170, is a solo piano piece by the Hungarian composer Franz Liszt, composed between 1845 and 1848. In the original edition it contained the title "Le Chant Du Croisé" or "The Chant of the Crusader". A typical performance of the piece lasts about 7 to 8 minutes.

Form and Structure

The piece contains two themes with a short introductory passage. The main theme is reiterated 7 times with different technical obstructions each time; the march-like second theme (marked Tempo di Marcia) is placed after the fifth iteration. It repeats itself only twice before returning into the main theme, though it returns with a modest coda at the close of the piece.

Notes

External links 
 

Compositions by Franz Liszt
Compositions in D-flat major
Piano ballades